Revolutionary Socialist League may refer to:

Revolutionary Socialist League (UK)
Revolutionary Socialist League (UK, 1938)
Revolutionary Socialist League (UK, 1957)
Revolutionary Socialist League (US) (1972–1989)
Revolutionary Socialist League (Germany) (1994–2016)